Baron is a title of nobility.

Baron, The Baron or Barons may also refer to:

Places
 Barons, Alberta, Canada
 Baron, Gard, France
 Baron, Gironde, France
 Baron, Oise, France
 Baron, Saône-et-Loire, France
 Baron-sur-Odon, France
 Baron, Allahabad, India
 Baron Hotel, in Aleppo, Syria

People
 Baron (name), people with the surname or given name Baron
 Baron (photographer), Sterling Henry Nahum (1906–1956)
 Feudal baron, a vassal holding a barony in fealty to an overlord
 Baron of the Exchequer, a type of English judge
 Cattle baron, the owner of very many cattle
 Business magnate, a powerful businessperson also called a baron

Sports
 Birmingham Barons, a Minor League Baseball team
 Cleveland Barons (disambiguation), several former ice hockey teams
 Oklahoma City Barons, a former ice hockey team in the American Hockey League
 Barons, the nickname of Brewton–Parker College athletics teams

Entertainment
 The Baron (novella), 1942 Portuguese novella by Branquinho da Fonseca
 The Baron (TV series), a mid-1960s British television series
 The Baron (album), 1981 album by American country singer Johnny Cash
 "The Baron" (song), 1981 song by Johnny Cash
 The Baron (film), a 2011 Portuguese film based on the novella
 The Barons, a 2009 Belgian film
 Baron, a fictional kingdom in the game Final Fantasy IV
 Baron Humbert von Gikkingen, a character in The Cat Returns
BARON.E, a Swiss pop music duo

Other uses
 Euthalia, a genus of butterflies known as barons
 Euthalia aconthea, a species of butterflies known as common barons
 BARON, a mathematical software package
 Beechcraft Baron, an aircraft
 Baron Services, a weather technology company
 Baron convention, in the game of contract bridge
 The Baron (horse), an Irish thoroughbred racehorse of the mid-19th century
 Baron, a cut of beef comprising a double sirloin joined at the backbone
 Baron Kriminel, a spirit in the Guédé family in Haitian Vodou
 Battlin' Baron, the mascot of Bethesda-Chevy Chase High School

See also
 Barony (disambiguation)
 Le Baron (disambiguation) (also spelled le Baron and LeBaron)
 Barron (disambiguation)
 Baroness (disambiguation)
 Baronett (disambiguation)
 Red Baron (disambiguation)
 Black Baron (disambiguation)
 Baranov (disambiguation)